Steve Oneschuk (November 30, 1930 – April 20, 1996) was a Canadian football player who played for the Hamilton Tiger-Cats. He won the Grey Cup with them in 1957. He previously played football at and attended the University of Toronto. Oneschuk was later a renowned wood carver. He died in 1996.

References

1930 births
1996 deaths
Hamilton Tiger-Cats players
Players of Canadian football from Ontario
Sportspeople from St. Catharines